The 1991 Lehigh Engineers football team was an American football team that represented Lehigh University during the 1991 NCAA Division I-AA football season. Lehigh tied for second in the Patriot League.

In their sixth year under head coach Hank Small, the Engineers compiled a 9–2 record. Rich Clark, Jarrod Johnson and Glenn Kempa were the team captains.

The Engineers outscored opponents 363 to 235. Lehigh's 3–2 conference record earned a three-way tie for second place in the six-team Patriot League standings.

A six-game win streak to start the year resulted in Lehigh appearing in the weekly national rankings from mid-October to early November. A loss to unranked Colgate bounced the Engineers from the top 20, and they finished the year unranked.

Lehigh played its home games at Goodman Stadium on the university's Goodman Campus in Bethlehem, Pennsylvania.

Schedule

References

Lehigh
Lehigh Mountain Hawks football seasons
Lehigh Engineers football